Deerfield Square is an upscale lifestyle center shopping area located in Deerfield, Illinois. The center was the first of its kind in the area, but now faces more competition. It opened in 2000. Major retailers in the mall include Ann Taylor LOFT, Walgreens, Whole Foods Market and Barnes & Noble. Also there is a small outdoor play structure north of Whole Foods.

History
Deerfield Square was redeveloped from the former Deerfield Commons shopping center, originally built in the 1950s. This redevelopment began in 1998. The  development was spearheaded by Northbrook developer Chuck Malk, who owned Deerfield Commons. Construction began in late 1998 and was completed in 2000. Deerfield Square has a  retail area and a  office space.
 
Deerfield square is located in Deerfield, IL (60015).

Shops in Deerfield Square 
Shops in Deerfield Square include:

Avenue Fashions
B Friends
Barnes & Noble
Café Zupas
Chase Bank
Chiropractic, Acupuncture and Herbal Medicine
CorePower Yoga
Deerfield Optical
Eisen Orthodontics
Gracie Barra Brazilian Jiu-jitsu 
Grand Prix Car Wash
Il Forno Pizzeria
Just Between Friends
LOFT
Mia's Fine Jewelry
MyHealth Dentistry
North Shore Hair Transplant Specialists
Ophthalmology Partners, LTD
Osterman Cleaners
Otero's Barber Shop
Potbelly Sandwich Works
Pure Barre
React Physical Therapy
Restore Hyper Wellness and Cryotherapy
Scout and Molly's
Tempur-Pedic Mattress
Tricoci Salon | Spa
Walgreens
Whole Foods

References

Deerfield, Illinois
Shopping malls in Lake County, Illinois
Shopping malls established in 2000
2000 establishments in Illinois